Hainania is the scientific name of two genera of organisms and may refer to:

Hainania (fish), a genus of fishes in the family Cyprinidae
Hainania (plant), a member of the subfamily Brownlowioideae